The British International Studies Association (BISA) is a learned society that promotes the study of international relations and related subjects through teaching, research, and facilitation of contact between scholars. BISA has an international membership of over 1,500 members, with over 80 countries represented. Chair is  Mark Webber (University of Birmingham). He succeeded Richard Whitman (University of Kent), who served as chair until 2015. The national office is based at the University of Birmingham.

BISA is a member society of the Academy of Social Sciences.

Foundation
In Jan 1974 an inaugural meeting was held at the 14th Bailey Conference on International Studies at the University of Surrey, and at that time, a draft interim constitution was agreed. The interim executive committee consisted of Alastair Francis Buchan (chairman), RJ Jones (secretary), Susan Strange (treasurer), PA Reynolds, G Goodwin, D Wrightman, CM Mason, T Taylor, A James and J Spence.

Publications
Review of International Studies
European Journal of International Security
The book series Cambridge Studies in International Relations in collaboration with Cambridge University Press

Annual prizes
BISA awards the following prizes at its annual international conference:
 Distinguished Contribution Prize
 Michael Nicholson Thesis Prize
 Susan Strange Book Prize
 PG BISA Teaching Excellence Prize
 BISA Teaching Excellence Prize
 Best Article in Review of International Studies

Working groups
Working groups are formed by members to enable collaboration and networking in specific subfields. There are currently about 30 groups focusing on specific areas of study and collaboration.

Funding
The association makes available funding via a variety of routes, working group funding, conference bursaries, founders fund awards, postgraduate network funding etc. Introduced in 2015, BISA also offers funding for Early Career Researchers’ projects with grants of up to £3,000.

External links

International relations
1974 establishments in the United Kingdom
Social sciences organizations
Organisations based in Birmingham, West Midlands
University of Birmingham
British International Studies Association